Dial is an unincorporated community in Kanawha County, West Virginia, United States.

The community most likely was named after an early settler.

References 

Unincorporated communities in West Virginia
Unincorporated communities in Kanawha County, West Virginia